The 2021–22 Abilene Christian Wildcats women's basketball team will represent Abilene Christian University during the 2021–22 NCAA Division I women's basketball season as members of the Western Athletic Conference. The Wildcats, led by tenth year head coach Julie Goodenough, play their home games at the Teague Center while the Moody Coliseum is undergoing renovation construction.

This season is the Lady Cardinals' first as members of the Western Athletic Conference. Lamar is one of four schools, all from Texas, that left the Southland Conference in July 2021 to join the WAC.

Previous season
The Wildcats finished the season 14–9, 6–7 in Southland Conference play to finish in seventh place. They won their first round game against tenth seeded Incarnate Word 70–81.  Their season ended with a 57–67 loss to sixth seeded Nicholls in the second round of the  Southland women's tournament.

Roster

Schedule
Sources:

|-
!colspan=9 style=";"| Non-conference regular season (0-0)
 

|-
!colspan=9 style=| WAC regular season (0-0)

|-
!colspan=9 style=|WAC Tournament (0-0)

See also
2021–22 Abilene Christian Wildcats men's basketball team

References

Abilene Christian Wildcats women's basketball seasons
Abilene Christian
Abilene Christian
Abilene Christian